The Best of Sword is a compilation album by the Canadian metal band Sword, released in 2006 by Aquarius Records.

Track listing

 "Stoned Again"	
 "F.T.W."
 "Until Death Do Us Part"
 "Outta Control"
 "Runaway"
 "Land of the Brave"
 "Children of Heaven"	
 "Prepare to Die"
 "State of Shock"
 "Evil Spell"
 "The Threat"
 "Sweet Dreams"

References

2006 compilation albums
Sword (band) albums
Aquarius Records (Canada) compilation albums